Narlısaray is a municipality in the Vezirköprü, Samsun Province, Turkey.

References

Populated places in Samsun Province
Vezirköprü